Emilius (1820–1847) was a British Thoroughbred racehorse and sire. In a career that lasted from April 1823 to October 1824 he ran ten times and won seven races, including a walkover. As a three-year-old in 1823 he was undefeated in six starts, including the Derby. After a less impressive year in 1824 he was retired to stud and became a highly successful and important breeding stallion.

Background
Emilius was a "muscular, compact" bay horse with a white star bred by his owner, Colonel John Udney. The colt was sent into training with Robert Robson, known as the "Emperor of Trainers" who produced the winners of thirty-four Classic races from his base at Newmarket, Suffolk. Emilius was ridden in all his races by the veteran Frank Buckle, who was fifty-seven years old at the time of the colt's greatest successes.

Emilius was sired by Orville, a successful staying racehorse who excelled over extreme distances. At stud he was Champion sire in 1817 and 1822 and sired the Classic winners Octavius (Derby), Charlotte (1000 Guineas), Zoe (1000 Guineas) and Ebor (St Leger).

Racing career

1823: three-year-old season
Emilius did not run as a two-year-old, but his performances on the Newmarket training gallops were enough for him to be regarded as one of the leading colts of his generation. By March 1823, still unraced, he was disputing the position of favourite for the Derby in the betting lists.

Emilius began his racing career at the Craven meeting at Newmarket on 14 April when he started 5/4 favourite for the Riddlesworth Stakes, a race which at the time had a prestige equal to the Classics and more prize money than the Derby. He won the 2,400 guinea prize, beating Talisman, from whom he was receiving three pounds. He then collected a further 1,500 guineas for his owner three days later without having to race as his rivals were withdrawn from the Dinner Stakes, and he was allowed to walk over to claim the prize. At the next Newmarket meeting he bypassed the 2000 Guineas to run in a Sweepstakes. When four of his opponents withdrew, Colonel Udney agreed to divide the prize money with Lord Exeter, the owner of Emilius's only remaining rival.

At Epsom Emilius started the 11/8 favourite in a field of eleven runners for the Derby. Tancred was next in the betting at 13/8 with the 2000 Guineas winner Nicolo on 10/1. Buckle sent Emilius to the front from the start and he maintained his lead until the turn into the straight at Tattenham corner. Here he was joined by Tancred and the two colts quickly drew clear of the field to dispute the finish between them. For most of the last quarter of a mile Tancred appeared to have the advantage, but Buckle was riding with great confidence and keeping Emilius under restraint until the last moment. When Buckle finally used his whip on the favourite, Emilius "sprung forward like a dart" and won by a length from Tancred with the rest of the runners too far behind to be placed by the judge. For Buckle, it was a fifth Derby and a twenty-fourth Classic. At Ascot in June, he started at 1/6 and won a 500 guinea Sweepstakes over a mile, his only rival being an unnamed colt by Whisker colt (later called Shaver). He was then rested until autumn.

At Newmarket, Emilius returned in the 1,200 guinea Grand Duke Michael Stakes on 29 September in which he faced the season's leading filly Zinc, the winner of the 1000 Guineas and The Oaks. Emilius started at odds of 1/2 and won easily. On his final start of the year Emilius beat Cinder by three lengths in a 1,000 guinea Sweepstakes on 13 October to complete an unbeaten season.

1824: four-year-old season
Emilius's winning sequence ended on his four-year-old debut. He was beaten by the six-year-old mare Augusta, winner of the 1821 Epsom Oaks from whom he was receiving six pounds in a 300 guinea match race at Newmarket on 7 May.

Emilius was off the racecourse for five months before returning for the autumn meetings at Newmarket. At the first October meeting he won a one-mile match against an unnamed colt known as "Jock the Laird's brother". Later that month he faced a much more competitive match in which he attempted to give seven pounds to the Ascot Gold Cup winner Bizarre and was beaten for the £300 prize. On his final start he ran poorly, finishing last of the six runners behind Zealot in the Audley End Stakes.

Stud career
At the end of his racing career Emilius was sold for 1,800 guineas to Thomas Thornhill who based the stallion at his Riddlesworth stud at Thetford, Norfolk at an initial fee of 20 guineas. As Emilius proved himself as a stallion his fee eventually rose to 50 guineas. When Thornhill died in 1844 Emilius, who was then in poor condition, was bought by Lord George Bentinck who rested the stallion and had him steadily restored to health. Bentinck then leased Emilius to R. M. Jaques to stand as a stallion at Easby Abbey in Yorkshire where he covered mares for two further years at a fee of 16 guineas. He died in September 1847 after choking on a meal of poorly prepared oats, and was buried in the grounds of the ruined abbey.

Emilius was an immediate success at stud. He was the British Champion sire in 1830 and 1831, and was regarded as the best sire of his time in England.

Pedigree

Like many thoroughbreds of this period, Emilius was inbred so some of the leading stallions of the late18th century. He was inbred 3×4 to Highflyer, meaning that this stallion appears in both the third and fourth generations of his pedigree. He was also inbred 4×4 to both Eclipse and Herod.

References

1820 racehorse births
1847 racehorse deaths
Epsom Derby winners
Racehorses trained in the United Kingdom
Racehorses bred in the United Kingdom
Thoroughbred family 28